Meet Miss Anxiety is a 2014 Chinese romantic comedy film directed by Kwak Jae-yong and starring Zhou Xun and Tong Dawei. It was released on December 12 in China.

Cast
Zhou Xun
Tong Dawei
Wallace Chung
Zhang Zilin
Kuo Shu-yao
Chan Fai-hung
Li Jing
White. K
Wu Bi
Mo Xi-er

Box office
By December 20, 2014, the film had earned ¥139.17 million at the Chinese box office.

Reception
Film Business Asia gave Meet Miss Anxiety a six out of ten rating, referring to it as an "attractive rom-com cast is ill-served by a poor script and routine direction".

References

External links

2014 romantic comedy films
Chinese romantic comedy films
Films directed by Kwak Jae-yong
Films set in Shanghai
Films shot in Shanghai
Films shot in Fujian